Jalna is a 1935 RKO Radio Pictures film based on the 1927 novel of the same name by Mazo de la Roche. It stars Kay Johnson, Ian Hunter and C. Aubrey Smith. In the film, a newlywed has to adjust to her husband's odd family.

Plot

Cast
Kay Johnson as Alayne Archer Whiteoak
Ian Hunter as Renny Whiteoak
C. Aubrey Smith as Uncle Nicholas Whiteoak
Nigel Bruce as Maurice Vaughan
David Manners as Eden Whiteoak
Peggy Wood as Meg Whiteoak
Jessie Ralph as Gran Whiteoak
Theodore Newton as Piers Whiteoak
Halliwell Hobbes as Uncle Ernest Whiteoak
George Offerman, Jr. as Finch Whiteoak
Clifford Severn as Wakefield "Wake" Whiteoak
Molly Lamont as Pheasant Vaughan Whiteoak
Forrester Harvey as Rags

Reception
The critic for The New York Times wrote, "the Whiteoaks are an interesting family—on paper or on the screen—and ... this first photoplay about them manages to do them justice." The reviewer praised "the generally splendid characterizations by an excellent cast".

References

External links

1935 films
1935 romantic drama films
1930s English-language films
American romantic drama films
American black-and-white films
Films based on Canadian novels
Films directed by John Cromwell
Films set in Ontario
RKO Pictures films
Films with screenplays by Garrett Fort
1930s American films